Tetrops rosarum is a species of beetle in the family Cerambycidae. It was described by Tsherepanov in 1975. It is known from Russia and possibly Mongolia.

References

Tetropini
Beetles described in 1975